Aretine may refer to:

 A person from Arezzo in Tuscany, Italy
 Arretine ware, pottery produced near Tuscany, Italy, since the first century B.C.